Jan-Erik Leinhos (born 14 May 1997) is a German professional footballer who plays as a right-back for USL League One side One Knoxville SC.

Amateur and collegiate career 
Leinhos was born in Felsberg, Germany, and played for the academy and senior team of KSV Hessen Kassel before moving to the United States to play college soccer with the Marshall Thundering Herd.

KSV Hessen Kassel 
Before joining Marshall University, Leinhos played for the academy and senior team of KSV Hessen Kassel, a semi-professional team in the German that played in the Regionalliga Südwest. Leinhos joined the club's youth academy in 2013 and went on to play 15 times for the club before moving to the United States.

College career 

Leinhos played soccer for Marshall University from 2018 until 2021. He made a total of 74 appearances and scored 9 goals over four seasons for the team. He was a part of the team that won the 2020 NCAA College Cup and won numerous accolades throughout his career.

Professional career

Louisville City FC 
Leinhos was invited to trial with the Louisville City upon completion of his senior season with Marshall. In February, Louisville City announced that it had signed Leinhos after a successful trial. Leinhos made his debut for the club in the U.S. Open Cup in a 1–0 win against Chattanooga Red Wolves. He further made his league debut, coming on in the 61st minute in a 5–2 win for Louisville against San Diego Loyal SC. Following the 2022 season, he was released by Louisville.

One Knoxville SC 
On 23 December 2022 Leinhos signed with USL League One side One Knoxville SC.

Career statistics

Honours 
KSV Hessen Kassel
 Regional Cup Hessen runner up: 2017–2018

Marshall Thundering Herd
 Conference USA regular season: 2020
 NCAA National Championship: 2020

References

External links 
 Jan-Erik Leinhos at Marshall Thundering Herd

1997 births
Living people
Association football defenders
German expatriate sportspeople in the United States
Expatriate soccer players in the United States
Marshall Thundering Herd men's soccer players
German footballers
Louisville City FC players
USL Championship players
German expatriate footballers
One Knoxville SC players
KSV Hessen Kassel players